Ann Georgina Shoebridge is an Australian milliner.  She was born in Melbourne, and now lives in Sydney.

Her work has been shown at the Sherman Contemporary Art Foundation, and the National Gallery of Victoria.

Shoebridge's hats are held in the National Gallery of Victoria collection, and have been presented at the Art Gallery of New South Wales.

She was a 2013 finalist for Hat Designer of the year.

References

Milliners
People from Melbourne
Artists from Sydney
20th-century Australian women
21st-century Australian women
21st-century Australian people
1973 births
Living people